Martin Lips (born 3 February 1955) is a Dutch equestrian. He competed in two events at the 1992 Summer Olympics.

References

External links
 

1955 births
Living people
Dutch male equestrians
Olympic equestrians of the Netherlands
Equestrians at the 1992 Summer Olympics
People from Geertruidenberg
Sportspeople from North Brabant